Chelsey Perry (born June 1, 1999) is an American basketball player who is currently a free agent. She played college basketball at UT Martin.

Early life 
Perry attended Middleton High School in Middleton, Tennessee. Perry was named a TSWA Class A All-State Honoree twice. During her senior year, she averaged 13.0 ppg, 12.0 rpg, 4.7 bpg, 2.3 spg, and 1.8 apg. She was named Most Valuable player during her sophomore season, as the Lady Tigers went 35–0 on their way to a State Championship. She was also a part of a Lady Tiger team that won 67 straight games.

College 
Following her high school career, Perry continued to play basketball at UT-Martin.

Freshman 
During her freshman season, Perry made an instant impact on the Skyhawks team. She was named an OVC All-Newcomer after averaging 11.2 points, 4.7 rebounds, 1.3 steals and 1.1 blocks. She won the Freshman of the Week Award three different times during the year.

Sophomore 
Prior to her sophomore year, Perry was tabbed to the Preseason All-OVC team due to her previous season. She continued to make an impact for the Skyhawks averaging 12.0 points, 5.5 rebounds, 1.3 assists, 1.2 steals, and 2.2 blocks. With all of this, Perry was named to the All-OVC 2nd Team.

Junior 
Perry made a huge jump in production in her junior year and she put herself on the map even more. She averaged 23.1 points, 7.0 rebounds, 2.7 blocks, 2.0 assists, and 1.6 steals. She joined the 1,000 point club during the year when they played Austin Peay. She also made a splash nationally – ranking 1st in the NCAA in field goals made, 2nd in total points, and 3rd in points per game and field goal attempts. Due to all her success, Perry was named to the WBCA Coaches' All-American Honorable Mention Team. She was also named UT Martin Bettye Giles Female Athlete of the Year, TSWA Women's Basketball Player of the Year, and a finalist for the Becky Hammon Mid-Major Player of the Year. She was also awarded the OVC Player of the Year, All-OVC 1st Team, and won a OVC record 8 Player of the Week Honors.

Senior 
Perry made her final year another one to remember for the Skyhawks. She won the OVC Player of the Year again, named to the WNIT Memphis All-Tournament team, All-OVC 1st Team. She once again received recognition nationally when she was named a semifinalist for the Becky Hammon Mid-Major Player of the Year and also to the Katrina McClain Award Midseason Top 10 List. She averaged 22.9 points, 7.2 rebounds, 1.8 assists, 1.7 blocks, and 1.1 steals in her final year.

She finished her career as the Skyhawks All-Time leader in career blocks (228) and 3rd in career points (1,963).

UT Martin statistics

Source

WNBA career

Indiana Fever
Perry was the 26th pick in the 2021 WNBA draft by the Indiana Fever – making her the 1st UT Martin player ever drafted in program history and the 1st OVC ever drafted. Perry was released on May 17th.  Perry was brought back to the Fever on June 28th on a rest of the season contract.

WNBA career statistics

Regular season

|-
| align="left" | 2021
| align="left" | Indiana
| 6 || 0 || 6.7 || .278 || .222 || .500 || 1.0 || 0.3 || 0.5 || 0.0 || 0.3 || 2.2
|-
| align="left" | Career
| align="left" | 1 year, 1 team
| 6 || 0 || 6.7 || .278 || .222 || .500 || 1.0 || 0.3 || 0.5 || 0.0 || 0.3 || 2.2

References

1999 births
Living people
American women's basketball players
Basketball players from Tennessee
Indiana Fever draft picks
Indiana Fever players
UT Martin Skyhawks women's basketball players